Senator Story may refer to:

Robert Story (politician) (born 1952), Montana State Senate
Tammy Story (born 1959), Colorado State Senate